The Russian Empire's role in the American Revolutionary War was part of a global conflict of colonial supremacy between the Thirteen Colonies and the Kingdom of Great Britain. Prior to the onset of the war, the Russian Empire under Catherine the Great had already begun exploration along North America's west coast; and, the year following the war's conclusion, Russia established its first colony in Alaska.  Although the Russian Empire did not directly send troops or supplies to the colonies or British Empire during the war, it responded to the Declaration of Independence, played a role in international diplomacy, and contributed to the lasting legacy of the American Revolution abroad.

Russia in North America prior to the war

As other European states expanded westward across the Atlantic Ocean, the Russian Empire went eastward and conquered the vast wilderness of Siberia. Although it initially went east with the hope of increasing its fur trade, the Russian imperial court in St. Petersburg hoped that its eastern expansion would also prove its cultural, political, and scientific belonging to Europe. The Eurasian empire looked to North America after reaching the Pacific Ocean in 1639 and occupying the Kamchatka Peninsula in the 1680s.

From 1729–1741, the Russian court-sponsored the Danish explorer Vitus Bering and his Russian counterpart Aleksei Chirikov to begin the Russian search for North America.  In their initial 1729 expedition, the pair missed the Alaskan coast due to thick fog.  When they set off again in 1741, Chirikov reached the shore of the Alaskan panhandle only to have his search party ambushed and killed by the native Tlingits.  After the dreadful event, Chirikov hurriedly sailed back to Kamchatka. Bering, on the other hand, had worse luck. He made it ashore to central Alaska, and then sailed back to Kamchatka along the barren Aleutians, only to endure a hard winter on one of the islands, losing many men. However, when Bering and his remaining crew returned to Petropavlovsk, they brought with them over nine hundred sea otter pelts.

The valuable furs with which survivors of Bering's expedition returned sparked greater interest in the fur trade.  Russian Promyshlenniki, or fur traders, began to set off to Alaska in droves with hopes of striking it rich. The drive to obtain furs led the promyshlenniki to conflict with the native Aleuts who raided the settlements, causing the traders to respond with threats, and forced commerce. The traders also inadvertently caused environmental harm - many animals were hunted to near extinction.  The tribes attacked their imperial overlords again in 1764, but their rising was met by fierce retribution and defeat at Russian hands in 1766.  Prior to the onset of the American Revolutionary War, the Russian expansion into North America boosted the empire's economy and prestige, but caused much detriment to the local wildlife of Alaska, and brought about the desolation of the Aleut through disease and warfare.

Russia and the Declaration of Independence

News of the Declaration of Independence's penning and signing finally reached Imperial Russia on August 13, 1776.  In imperial correspondence, Vasilii Grigor'evich Lizakevich, a Russian ambassador in London wrote to Count Nikita Ivanovich Panin, a Russian statesmen, and praised the leadership, bravery, and virtue of colonial leaders as shown through the declaration.  It is worth noting, though, that, in this same dispatch, Lizakevich never noted the "natural rights of man" mentioned in the document; and, instead only focused on the actions of the American forefathers.  When Catherine the Great caught wind of the declaration's creation and adoption, the tsarina attributed the actions of Britain's former colonists to "personal fault" on the part of the British Crown in the form of its colonial policies.  Moreover, the monarch believed "that the separation of the colonies from the mother country did not conflict with the interests of Russia and might even be advantageous to her."

More documentation of the Russian reception of the Declaration of Independence comes from the accounts of Pavel Petrovich Svinyin, a representative of the tsarist government to the United States.  In his accounts from 1811–1813, Svinyin noted that it appeared that American civilians enjoyed almost all the enumerated liberties as outlined by the declaration and constitution.  Despite the publication of Svinyin's observations of American life, the full text of the Declaration of Independence was outlawed in the Russian Empire until the reign and reform era of Tsar Alexander II ( 1855-1881 ).  Historians attribute this absence of the document to the disconnect between the Declaration of Independence's values and the policies which the Russian monarchy enforced.

The Declaration of Independence also inspired the beliefs and doctrines of some members of Russia's Decembrist Uprising.  To them, America represented a sort of "motherland of freedom."  Even though it was never fully published before the Decembrist Revolt, the Declaration of Independence still managed to infiltrate the minds of members of Russian society.

Russian diplomacy during the war

Catherine the Great and imperial policy

Catherine the Great, a Russian empress who ruled from 1762–1796, played a modest role in the American Revolutionary War through her politicking with other European heads of state.  Initially, the tsarina took a keen interest in the American struggle because it affected "English and European politics" and frankly believed that Britain was to blame for the conflict.  She held a negative opinion of King George and his diplomats, often treating them with contempt.  Nonetheless, the British crown still formally requested 20,000 troops in 1775 and sought an alliance.  She refused both pleas.  Upon Spain's entry into the war, Britain once again turned to the Russian Empire, but this time, the English hoped for naval support. Catherine II once again ignored the British requests.

Perhaps Catherine the Great's greatest diplomatic contribution came from the creation and proclamation of the First League of Armed Neutrality in 1780.  This declaration of armed neutrality had several stipulations, but three crucial ones: first, "that neutral ships may freely visit the ports of belligerent Powers;" second, "that the goods of belligerent Powers on neutral ships are permitted to pass without hindrance, with the exception of war contraband;" and, third, "under the definition of a blockaded port falls only a port into which entry is actually hampered by naval forces." Most European nations agreed to these terms, but Britain refused to recognize the arrangement because it undermined the blockade, its most effective military strategy.  After establishing a league of neutral parties, Catherine the Great attempted to act as a mediator between the United States and Britain by submitting a ceasefire plan.  During her attempts at mediation, though, the Battle of Yorktown thwarted any hope of a peaceful and diplomatic solution to the American Revolutionary War.

These negotiations were accompanied by political intrigue. In 1780, during the period of Catherine II's mediating, Britain attempted to bribe the Russian Empire into an alliance. London offered St. Petersburg the island of Menorca if the Russians would agree to join the British in the war. Despite the economic boost such an acquisition offered, Catherine the Great refused this bribe and utilized it as an opportunity to make George III a laughing–stock of the European powers.

Even though she took a rather ambivalent approach to the international policy during the period of the American Revolution, some scholars believe that history has smiled too much on Catherine the Great during this time. This negative opinion of the tsarina holds that she simply acted in the best interest of the Russian Empire and did not actually care for the cause of the Thirteen Colonies.

Francis Dana's mission

Francis Dana served as the United States Ambassador to Russia from December 19, 1780 until September 1783. His original mission was to "sign in St. Petersburg the convention about the adherence of the United States to the armed neutrality, and to reach an agreement about a treaty concerning friendship and trade."

Dana experienced some difficulties during his trip.  First off, the Russian Empire had not yet recognized the United States as a nation, and, secondly, the Russians could not formally accept a representative from a state which they had not yet acknowledged.  The American diplomat fought against these presumptions and put forth, in a long memorandum to the Russian imperial court, that America's nationhood stemmed from the Declaration of Independence and not from a peace treaty with Great Britain.  However, "The argumentation of Francis Dana, based on the principles of popular sovereignty, could not, it goes without saying, make a special impression (on the contrary, only a negative one) on the Tsarist Government."  Due to these hindrances to the success of his mission, Robert Livingston moved that the Continental Congress recall Dana from St. Petersburg. Ironically, Dana left Russia the day after the signing of the peace treaty between the United States and Britain. Unfortunately for Francis Dana, he spent years in the Russian courts only to see his mission uncompleted.

Many historians have overlooked the broader political occurrences at the time of Dana's mission.  Several believe Catherine II's refusal to acknowledge the American diplomat rooted itself in Russia's desire to avoid conflict with Great Britain.  However, Catherine the Great used her denial of Dana as a leverage point in her annexation of Crimea. She voiced to her fellow heads of state that she remained neutral during their conflicts, so they should not meddle with her political affairs. Perhaps this politicking on the part of Catherine II also played a role in the failure of Dana's quest.

Legacy of the war in Russia and America
Unbeknownst to many, Russia played a significant role in the American Revolutionary War. First and foremost, Catherine the Great's position as perhaps the foremost sponsor of ongoing mediations between the European powers and America, that transpired during the war years, ultimately served as a means of legitimizing and rallying support for the American cause, amongst the other European powers. Her political and military positions acted to further isolate the British within greater European politics, and in the final analysis, to help pave the way for the eventual victory of the young republic. "The proclamation of the Declaration of Armed Neutrality by Russia, which received the official approval of the Continental Congress of the United States in October 1780, had great international significance."  If Catherine the Great had not politically maneuvered with other imperial powers and negotiated neutrality with other potentially belligerent states, and if instead, she had chosen to support the British position, then perhaps the American Revolution may have been a somewhat different story.

Other than Russia's influence on the United States during this time, the Eurasian Empire and the United States had many mutually beneficial relationships. Several scholars from both states, such as Benjamin Franklin and Mikhail Lomonosov, had direct or indirect relationships with one another.  The Imperial Academy of Sciences in St. Petersburg even elected Franklin to its honorary ranks in November 1789.  Russia and America also shared a prosperous commercial relationship.  Though no Russian ships directly reached the ports of America during the war due to the empire's declaration of neutrality, many merchants from both countries were freely trading with each other after 1783.  

In December 1807 Russia first officially agreed to provide full diplomatic recognition of the new American republic, authorizing a full top-level diplomatic exchange.  On December 18, 1832, the two countries formally signed a trade treaty that K.V. Nesselrode and James Buchanan negotiated.  Upon the signing of this agreement, President Andrew Jackson remarked that the trade "furnishe[d] new motives for that mutual friendship which both countries have so far nourished with respect to each other."  Jackson was not the only president to speak to the connections of Russia and America. Before the official trade agreement, the various benevolent relationships between Russia and the United States would even lead President Thomas Jefferson to declare "Russia as the Power friendliest to the Americans." Clearly, the American Revolution started a trend of positive relations between the two states.

Despite these examples of positive connections between Russia and America during this time, one cannot ignore the ideological conflict that would have existed between the monarchical empire and democratic republic.  Although the American victory undoubtedly weakened the British Empire, the American Revolution "provoked a sharply negative reaction of the ruling classes" in Russia, and, most likely, in other European states. Moreover, it was impossible to speak out about changes to Russia's political structure, potential of revolution, or democratic freedoms during this period. One could "write more or less objectively about the right to freedom and independence of the American people, and its experience of victorious revolutionary struggle against England."  Such revolutionary ideology inspired Russian authors Alexander Radishchev and Nikolay Novikov to write about American successes during the war, condemn slavery, and rebuke the decimation of Native Americans. As time passed, the American Revolution even inspired some members of the Decembrist Revolt in St. Petersburg as, to them, America represented a sort of "motherland of freedom."  Although revolution in Russia would not succeed until 1917, the ideals that inspired American patriots created ripples in the tsarist empire.

See also
 Russian Empire–United States relations
 Russia–United States relations

Notes

Further reading
 Bailey, Thomas A., America Faces Russia: Russian–American Relations from Early Times to Our Day, (Ithaca: Cornell University Press, 1950), 1–11.
 Bolkhovitinov, Nikolai N., "The Declaration of Independence: A View from Russia," The Journal of American History (1999), 1389–1398.
 Bolkhovitinov, Nikolai N., Russia and the American Revolution, (Tallahassee: The Diplomatic Press, 1976).
 Desmarais, Norman, "Russia and the American War for Independence," Journal of the American Revolution (2015).
 Golder, Frank A., "Catherine II. and the American Revolution," The American Historical Review (1915), 92–96.
 Rogger, Hans.  "The influence of the American Revolution in Russia." in Jack P. Greene and J. R. Pole, eds. A Companion to the American Revolution (2000): 554-555.
 Taylor, Alan, American Colonies: The Settling of North America (New York: Penguin, 2001).

American Revolutionary War
American Revolutionary War
American Revolutionary War